Arbër Mone (31) (born 8 June 1988) is an Albanian professional footballer who currently plays for Lushnja in the Albanian First Division.

References

External links
 Profile - FSHF

1988 births
Living people
Sportspeople from Fier
Albanian footballers
Association football midfielders
Association football defenders
KF Naftëtari Kuçovë players
KF Apolonia Fier players
KF Himara players
KF Tërbuni Pukë players
KF Bylis Ballsh players
KS Lushnja players
KF Ferizaj players
Football Superleague of Kosovo players
Albanian expatriate footballers
Expatriate footballers in Kosovo
Albanian expatriate sportspeople in Kosovo